The 1931 Volta a Catalunya was the 13th edition of the Volta a Catalunya cycle race and was held from 6 September to 13 September 1931. The race started and finished in Barcelona. The race was won by Salvador Cardona.

Route and stages

General classification

References

1931
Volta
1931 in Spanish road cycling
September 1931 sports events